Luciobarbus graellsii is a ray-finned fish species in the family Cyprinidae. It is here placed in Luciobarbus following the IUCN, but that genus is very closely related to the other typical barbels and perhaps better considered a mere subgenus of Barbus. The Andalusian barbel was formerly included in L. bocagei as subspecies.

In addition, L. graellsii has – like its close relative the "Albanian barbel" (Luciobarbus albanicus) and the slightly more distantly related red-tailed barbel (Barbus haasi) – also been placed in Messinobarbus. But even if that genus is valid, it is probably incorrect to do so.

It was originally endemic to the northeast of Spain, occurring chiefly on the Mediterranean side in the Ebro's to Ter River' drainage basins, but also on the Atlantic side to the Asón drainage basin. Around 1998, it was introduced to some rivers of Tuscany (Italy) and is now well established in the Albegna, Fiora and Ombrone drainage basins.

L. graellsii is an omnivore, eating mainly large aquatic invertebrates and algae. They spawn from late spring to the height of summer (May to August). They migrate upstream to their spawning sites, which are in faster and more shallow stretches of river, where the bottom is made of gravel and rocks. It is long-lived, and can get up to 16 years old. Abundant in its range, the Ebro Barbel not considered a threatened species by the IUCN.

References

  (2008): Natural hybridization of Barbus bocagei x Barbus comizo (Cyprinidae) in Tagus River basin, central Spain [English with French abstract]. Cybium 32(2): 99–102. PDF fulltext
  (2007): Evolutionary origin of Lake Tana's (Ethiopia) small Barbus species: indications of rapid ecological divergence and speciation. Anim. Biol. 57(1): 39–48.  (HTML abstract)

External links
 Video of Ebro Barbels Luciobarbus graellsii on Youtube

graellsii
Cyprinid fish of Europe
Fish described in 1866
Taxa named by Franz Steindachner
Taxonomy articles created by Polbot